Karl Joachim "Jock" Weintraub (December 31, 1924, Darmstadt, Germany – March 25, 2004, Chicago, Ill.) was a longtime professor of history at the University of Chicago, having taught there since 1954. He was a strong proponent of liberal education and wrote and spoke extensively on its value.

Weintraub was born in Germany to parents of German and Russian-Jewish ancestry; in reaction to the increasing Nazi discrimination against Jews, they fled to the Netherlands in 1935, where they were forced into hiding during the Nazi occupation. During this time, Weintraub attended the Quaker Eerde School. He and his sister Tatjana Wood emigrated to the United States in 1948. He received his post-secondary education at the University of Chicago, attaining a B.A. in 1949, a Master's in 1952, and a Ph.D. in History in 1957.

Weintraub's scholarship focused on culture, autobiography, and the history of the self; he was the author of Visions Of Culture (1966) and The Value Of The Individual: Self and Circumstance in Autobiography (1978). Weintraub noted that 18th- and 19th-century autobiographical writers often used a narrative of "development" in their stories, as distinct from earlier autobiographies' use of a narrative of "unfolding". He was a renowned teacher of the University of the Chicago's core course in Western Civilization, which is still taught by his wife Katy O'Brien Weintraub. Weintraub's classes, with a head count typically capped in the twenties, would attract hundreds of potential students and were some of the most popular classes at the college for many years.

Further reading
Andreas W. Daum, “Refugees from Nazi Germany as Historians: Origins and Migrations, Interests and Identities,” in The Second Generation: Émigrés from Nazi Germany as Historians. With a Biobibliographic Guide, ed. Andreas Daum, Hartmut Lehmann, and James J. Sheehan, 1‒52.

References

1924 births
2004 deaths
German emigrants to the United States
University of Chicago alumni
University of Chicago faculty
20th-century American historians
American male non-fiction writers
20th-century American male writers